Edmond Alexander MacNaghten (2 August 1762 – 15 March 1832) was an Irish Tory politician from County Antrim. He sat in the Irish House of Commons from 1797 until the Act of Union in 1800, and then in the House of Commons of the United Kingdom from 1801 to 1830.

He was the oldest son of Edmund MacNaghten of Beardiville House (between Coleraine and Bushmills, County Antrim). His mother Hannah was a daughter of John Johnstone of Belfast. MacNaghten  was educated at Glasgow University and at Lincoln's Inn.

In the Irish House of Commons he sat for County Antrim from 1797 until the Union,
then he was a Member of Parliament (MP) for Antrim at Westminster until 1812.
From 1812 to 1826 he was an MP for Orford in Suffolk, before sitting again for Antrim until 1830.

MacNaghten was High Sheriff of County Antrim from 1793–4, became a trustee of the Irish Linen Board in 1810.
He was a Commissioner of the Treasury for Ireland from 1813–17, and for the United Kingdom from March 1819 to July 1830.

In  1818 he was made chief of Clan MacNaghten.

References

External links 
 
 

1762 births
1832 deaths
People from County Antrim
Irish MPs 1798–1800
Members of the Parliament of Ireland (pre-1801) for County Antrim constituencies
Members of the Parliament of the United Kingdom for County Antrim constituencies (1801–1922)
Members of the Parliament of the United Kingdom for English constituencies
UK MPs 1801–1802
UK MPs 1802–1806
UK MPs 1806–1807
UK MPs 1807–1812
UK MPs 1812–1818
UK MPs 1818–1820
UK MPs 1820–1826
UK MPs 1826–1830
High Sheriffs of Antrim
Tory MPs (pre-1834)
Alumni of the University of Glasgow
Members of Lincoln's Inn
Commissioners of the Treasury for Ireland